Bracket racing is a form of drag racing that allows for a handicap between predicted elapsed time of the two cars over a standard distance, typically within the three standard distances (1/8 mile, 1,000 foot, or 1/4 mile) of drag racing.

Goal

The effect of the bracket racing rules is to place a premium on consistency of performance of the driver and car rather than on raw speed, which in turn makes victory much less dependent on large infusions of money and more dependent on mechanical and driving skill. This includes reaction times, shifting abilities, and ability to control the car. Therefore, bracket racing (using the aforementioned handicapping system) is popular with casual weekend racers, some who even drive their vehicles to the track, race them, and then simply drive them home.

This format allows for a wide variety of cars racing against each other.  While traditional drag racing separates cars into a wide variety of classes based on power and weight, bracket racing classes can be simpler, and can accommodate any vehicle with basic technical/safety inspection. Race events organized in this way are sometimes called "run-what-ya-brung".

Format

Dial-in

Each car chooses a dial-in time before the race, predicting the elapsed time the driver estimates it will take their car to cross the finish line. This is usually displayed on one or more windows so the starter can adjust the "christmas tree" starting lights accordingly. The slower car in the race is given the green light before the faster car by a margin of the difference between their two dial-in times.

In principle, if both drivers have equal reaction times and their cars run exactly their posted dial-ins, both cars should cross the finish line at precisely the same time. In reality, this is an extremely rare occurrence. Measuring devices both at the start and at the end of the track post times down to 1/100000 of a second (0.00001s precision), which makes tied races almost impossible.

Some forms of bracket racing (NHRA Competition Eliminator, NHRA Stock groups) have cars classified by type, and the dial-in time is based on the type of car that is entered.

Reaction time

When a car leaves the starting line, a timer is started for that car. The difference between when the green light comes on and when the car actually leaves the starting line is called the reaction time.  If a driver leaves before the light turns green, he/she is automatically red-lighted and disqualified for that round unless the opponent commits a more serious violation (crossing a track boundary line, timing block, or touching the barrier).   Depending on the Tree being used, either the first car to redlight, or as used in most national events with TruStart, the driver who has a worse red-light foul, is provisionally disqualified.  The slower car, in the traditional system, which will be leaving the line first, has the disadvantage of being dead in the water if he red lights, even if his faster opponent redlights by a larger margin, which is why the TruStart system was developed to negate that problem.

Sometimes, people incorrectly refer "reaction time" to the unrelated 60 foot takeoff time. The reaction time is merely an indication of how fast a driver reacted compared to when the green light came on. The 60 foot takeoff time is an indicator of how fast the vehicle started moving at the beginning of the race, regardless of the driver’s reaction time. If the driver launched the car with too much power for the available traction, he will have wheelspin and correspondingly will have a longer time to cross the 60 foot barrier if he were to drive with more finesse.

Breaking out
Breaking out is when a racer manages to cross the finish line in less time than the one he dialed-in beforehand.

 If only one car "breaks out", it is disqualified and the other one wins by default.
 If both cars break out, the one closer to the dial-in time wins.
 A foul start, crossing the boundary line or wall, or failure to be at post-race inspection override any breaking out violations.
 Not all bracket racing classes have breaking out (NHRA Competition Eliminator).
 Based on a driver's competition licence or a chassis certification, an absolute limit may be imposed.  A car going faster than the absolute limit may be automatically disqualified.

Absolute Breakout
An absolute breakout is imposed based on the licensing of the vehicle and/or the driver.  Depending on class, a driver may be given one warning, but in most cases they are immediately disqualified.  Violations involving absolute breakout include:

  A car goes faster than the legal certification limit of the chassis.  Examples include:
 A dragster that is not certified for Top Alcohol Dragster is faster than 5.99 seconds required for Top Alcohol Dragster certification.
 A full bodied car that is certified for 7.50 seconds goes faster than 7.49 seconds.
 A stock sedan with just a standard three-point harness goes faster than 11.49 seconds (five point harness required at that speed).
 A vehicle goes 150 mph (240 km/h) or faster in the quarter-mile and does not have a parachute, required for cars that speed or faster.
  A driver goes faster than the legal limit of his competition licence.  Examples include:
 A driver's competition licence only is for cars 7.50 to 8.99 seconds, and his car goes faster than 7.49 seconds.
 In Junior Dragster, a driver goes faster than the absolute limit imposed by his competition licence or is warned two times during a meeting:
 Drivers age 5 cannot be faster than 20.00 seconds in the eighth mile during their solo passes.
 Drivers 6-7 are restricted to 13.90 in the eighth mile, with a warning at 13.70 (or 7.00 in the sixteenth mile), with an absolute limit of 13.50 (or 6.80).
 Drivers 8-9 are restricted to 11.90 in the eighth mile, with a warning at 11.70 (or 6.10), with an absolute limit of 11.50 (or 5.90).
 Drivers 10-12 are restricted to 8.90 in the eighth mile, with a warning at 8.70 (or 4.70), with an absolute limit of 8.50 (or 4.50).
 Drivers 13-18 are restricted to 7.90 in the eighth mile, with an absolute limit of 7.50 (or 4.10) and 85.00 MPH.
 Drivers in Jr Comp are restricted to 6.90 in the eighth mile, with an absolute limit of 6.70 and 110.00 MPH.
 Drivers who exceed the absolute limit are subject to further NHRA discipline.  
Examples:

This eliminates any advantage from bending the rules by putting a slow dial-in time on the windshield to get a head start. However, some racers will purposely dial a slower time and then let off of the throttle or use their brakes near the end of the track in an attempt to use strategy to win the race rather than relying on the car to run the dial in.

Bracket Racing Strategy

Bracket racing boils down mainly into one thing; putting up the best "package". The best package is technically the winner in every drag race. A "package" is : package = drivers reaction time + deviation from the dial-in.
 
For example:

Driver A has a reaction time of 0.025 and his car runs 9.653 on a 9.64 dial in. His package = 0.025 + (9.653-9.64) = 0.038

Driver B has a reaction time of 0.005 and his car runs 10.684 on a 10.66 dial in. His package = 0.005 + (10.684-10.66) = 0.029

In this scenario driver B wins despite his car running further off the number. But we can deduce even more than just that he won; we can see that he won by a (0.038 - 0.029) = 0.009 finish margin which is about 22 inches at about 140 mph.

The formula used to calculate the margin of victory is :

17.6 * finish margin * behind vehicle mph = finish margin in inches

Professional (and some amateur) bracket racing has evolved over the years into a drivers' sport. It used to consist of trying to get a good reaction time then hoping the car ran near the number. Drivers would avoid breaking out like the plague, dialing their cars 0.01 faster than it had ever gone before.

Now it has turned into a chess match between two drivers, guessing each other's next move. The race starts in the staging lane where drivers get ready to race, and decide what dial in to put on their cars. This is arguably the most important part of a bracket race: making sure of being able to "run the number". In other words, drivers make sure they can go as fast as their dial in says they can. Everyone has a different strategy, but any strategy has its flaws and can be beaten; that why the best strategy is one that includes many different strategies and cannot be predicted.

Red Light and other fouls

If a car leaves the starting line before the green light comes on, a foul is recorded (a red-light start), and that car is provisionally disqualified.  Traditionally, only the first car to foul start is shown the red light;  an automatic green light is shown in the other lane at the appropriate time.  Since 2016, many tracks (and the NHRA) now use TruStart, which is new code written to the Christmas Tree.  When the first car launches, a green light will be initially shown, even if the driver committed a foul start.  Once the second driver leaves, if one driver has a negative reaction time (foul start), that driver's lane will be shown a red light.  If both lanes show a negative reaction time, only the lane with the worse negative reaction time will be shown a red light (left lane -.021 and right lane -.020, red light on the left lane only).  Another form of foul is to cross the dividing line between the two lanes, or the line at the edge of the racing surface, both of which negates a red light foul. A foul is worse than a break out; one car can break out but if the other car fouls, the car that breaks out advances to the next round unless it is an absolute breakout (in certain classes only).  If both cars foul, the lesser of the violations is the winner;  a break-out is the least serious violation, then a red light, crossing the boundary line at the edge of the surface, crossing the dividing line between the lanes, leaving before the tree is started, failure of technical inspection after the run, and then absolute breakout.

Both cars are disqualified in double fouls if both competitors cross either boundary line (edge of surface or dividing lane between lanes), but if one car has crossed the boundary line and the other car must cross the line to avoid the car that first crossed, the car that crossed the line to avoid a collision is automatically declared the winner and advances.  Only one car is disqualified if both competitors commit different fouls of the other type.  Both drivers are disqualified if they leave before the tree is started, but if video evidence can show which of the two drivers left first, only the first driver is disqualified.  If one car leaves before the tree is started, the other driver is automatically the winner, regardless of a further red light or crossing either boundary line (which by rule becomes a single run with a "no time, took green light" win status).  In a final, in case of a double disqualification on boundary lines or leaving before the tree is started, only the first driver to foul (cross the boundary line, leave before tree started) will be tagged.

In any single run, once a car is staged (bye run or opponent unable to stage), it automatically wins and does not need to cross the finish line.  The driver will not be shown a red light for a foul start, as the red light is automatically placedin the other lane.  However, if the car crosses a boundary line, the run will be disqualified. 
In such cases, the car will be scored as if it did not finish ("no time, took green light").

References

External links
Basics of Drag Racing: E.T. Racing Explained

Drag racing